The 1966–67 Sussex County Football League season was the 42nd in the history of Sussex County Football League a football competition in England.

Division One

Division One featured 14 clubs which competed in the division last season, along with two new clubs, promoted from Division Two:
Horsham YMCA
Newhaven

League table

Division Two

Division Two featured 15 clubs which competed in the division last season, along with two new clubs, relegated from Division One:
Arundel
Wigmore Athletic

League table

References

1966-67
S